Calothamnus glaber is a plant in the myrtle family, Myrtaceae and is endemic to near-coastal areas in the south-west of Western Australia. (In 2014 Craven, Edwards and Cowley proposed that the species be renamed Melaleuca glabra.) It is a shrub, similar to Calothamnus blepharospermus but its leaves are slightly longer and narrower and the parts of its flowers are glabrous.

Description

The flowers are bright red and arranged in small clusters amongst the older leaves and mostly on one side of the stem. The outer edge of the flower cup (the hypanthium) and the sepals are glabrous.

Taxonomy and naming
Calothamnus blepharosperma var. glabra was first formally described in 1867 by George Bentham. Trevor Hawkeswood annotated the herbarium sheets and Alex George raised the variety to species status in 2010. The specific epithet glaber is a Latin word meaning without hair, smooth.

Distribution
Calothamnus glaber occurs in the Avon Wheatbelt, Carnarvon, Geraldton Sandplains, Swan Coastal Plain and Yalgoo biogeographic regions.

Conservation
Calothamnus glaber is classified as "not threatened" by the Western Australian Government Department of Parks and Wildlife.

References

glaber
Endemic flora of Western Australia
Myrtales of Australia
Plants described in 1867
Taxa named by George Bentham